Silver Tower may refer to:

Silver Tower (Abu Dhabi)
Silver Tower, novel by author Dale Brown
Silver Towers
Silberturm, also known as Silver Tower